Year 1050 (ML) was a common year starting on Monday (link will display the full calendar) of the Julian calendar.

Events 
 By place 

 Europe 
 Hedeby is sacked by King Harald III (Hardrada) of Norway, during the course of a conflict with Sweyn II of Denmark.
 King Anund Jacob dies after a 28-year reign. He is succeeded by his brother Emund the Old as king of Sweden.
 Macbeth (the Red King) of Scotland makes a pilgrimage to Rome.

 Africa 
 Aoudaghost, an important Berber trading center and rival of Koumbi Saleh, is captured by the Ghana Empire.

 By topic 

 Religion 
 King Edward the Confessor unites the dioceses of Devon and Cornwall located at Crediton. He moves the see to Exeter and gives the order to build a cathedral. Leofric becomes the first bishop of Exeter.
 The brewery of Weltenburg Abbey (modern Germany) is first mentioned, thus making it one of the oldest still operating breweries in the world (approximate date).

Births 
 November 11 – Henry IV, Holy Roman Emperor (d. 1106)
 Amadeus II, count of Savoy (approximate date)
 Berthold II, duke of Swabia (approximate date)
 Bertrand of Comminges, French bishop (d. 1126)
 Frederick I, duke of Swabia (approximate date)
 Leopold II (the Fair), margrave of Austria (d. 1095)
 Lhachen Gyalpo, king of Ladakh (approximate date)
 Liutold of Eppenstein, German nobleman (approximate date)
 Li Tang, Chinese landscape painter (approximate date)
 Lope Íñiguez, lord of Biscay (approximate date)
 Michael VII (Doukas), Byzantine emperor (approximate date)
 Muhammad al-Baghdadi, Arab mathematician (d. 1141)
 Muirchertach Ua Briain, king of Munster (approximate date)
 Olaf I (Hunger), king of Denmark (approximate date)
 Olaf III (the Peaceful), king of Norway (approximate date)
 Osbern of Canterbury, English hagiographer (d. 1090)
 Peter the Hermit, French priest (approximate date)
 Sophia of Hungary, duchess of Saxony (approximate date)
 Sviatopolk II, Grand Prince of Kiev (d. 1113)
 Vidyakara, Indian Buddhist scholar (d. 1130)

Deaths 
 February 10 – Anna, Grand Princess of Kiev (b. 1001)
 October 29 – Eadsige, archbishop of Canterbury
 Alferius (or Alferio), Italian abbot and saint (b. 930)
 Anund Jacob (or James), king of Sweden (b. 1008)
 Casilda of Toledo, Spanish saint (approximate date)
 Constantine Arianites, Byzantine general
 Einar Thambarskelfir, Norwegian nobleman
 Herleva, Norman noblewoman (approximate date)
 Hugh of Langres, French bishop and theologian
 Humphrey de Vieilles, Norman nobleman
 Michael Dokeianos, Byzantine general
 Suryavarman I, king of the Khmer Empire
 Wifred II, count of Cerdanya and Berga
 Zoë, empress of the Byzantine Empire

References